Wildwood is an unincorporated community located in Leflore County, Mississippi.

It is part of the Greenwood, Mississippi micropolitan area.

History
The community is named for the Wildwood Plantation, which was founded in 1852. The Wildwood Plantation Commissary and Shop are listed on the National Register of Historic Places.

Notable people
 David "Honeyboy" Edwards, delta blues musician, lived at Wildwood as a child
 Charles E. Merrill, co-founder of Merrill Lynch, spent time in Wildwood as a youth and owned Wildwood Plantation until 1938.

References

Unincorporated communities in Leflore County, Mississippi
Unincorporated communities in Mississippi
Greenwood, Mississippi micropolitan area